Equid gammaherpesvirus 2, formerly Equine herpesvirus 2 (EHV-2), is a virus of the family Herpesviridae, originally known as equine cytomegalovirus due to its slow replication in tissue culture.  However, complete sequencing of the EHV-2 genome has demonstrated that it is a member of the subfamily Gammaherpesvirinae, in the genus Percavirus. It has an uncertain role in respiratory disease in horses, but EHV-2 has been isolated from cases exhibiting symptoms such as coughing, conjunctivitis, and swollen submaxillary and parotid lymph nodes.

References

Gammaherpesvirinae
Horse diseases
Animal viral diseases